The Central Securities Depository of Poland (Krajowy Depozyt Papierów Wartościowych, KDPW) is a Polish central securities depository responsible for the management and supervision of the depository-settlement system as it relates to the trading of financial instruments in Poland. Polish CSD holds securities in uncertificated (dematerialized) form. It is a joint-stock company owned by 3 shareholders: the Polish Ministry of Treasury, the Warsaw Stock Exchange, and the National Bank of Poland.

CSD of Poland has operated as a department of the Polish Stock Exchange since 1991, and has been a joint-stock company since November 1994.

It participates in Association of National Numbering Agencies and European Central Securities Depositories Association.

References

External links 
 KDPW

Government agencies of Poland
Central securities depositories